Bakaiya is a Rural municipality located within the Makwanpur District of the Bagmati Province of Nepal.
The municipality spans  of area, with a total population of 39,620 according to a 2011 Nepal census.

On March 10, 2017, the Government of Nepal restructured the local level bodies into 753 new local level structures.
The previous Dhimal, Chhatiwan, Shikharpur, Manthali and Thingan VDCs were merged to form Bakaiya Rural Municipality.
Bakaiya is divided into 12 wards, with Chhatiwan declared the administrative center of the rural municipality.

Demographics
At the time of the 2011 Nepal census, Bakaiya Rural Municipality had a population of 39,642. Of these, 73.1% spoke Tamang, 25.4% Nepali, 0.5% Magar, 0.3% Bhojpuri, 0.3% Rai, 0.2% Maithili, 0.1% Newar and 0.1% other languages as their first language.

In terms of ethnicity/caste, 73.3% were Tamang, 6.0% Hill Brahmin, 5.8% Chhetri, 3.3% Majhi, 3.0% Kami, 2.1% Rai, 1.4% Magar, 1.1% Danuwar, 1.1% Ghale, 0.4% Damai/Dholi, 0.4% Newar, 0.3% other Dalit, 0.3% Gurung, 0.3% Terai Brahmin, 0.2% Sunuwar, 0.1% Brahmu/Baramo, 0.1% Kalwar, 0.1% Kathabaniyan, 0.1% Pahari, 0.1% Yadav and 0.3% others.

In terms of religion, 72.8% were Buddhist, 25.7% Hindu, 1.2% Christian and 0.3% others.

References

External links
official website of the rural municipality

Rural municipalities in Makwanpur District
Rural municipalities of Nepal established in 2017